Matt Teeters (born February 22, 1983) is an American politician and a Republican member of the Wyoming House of Representatives representing District 5 since his appointment in 2006.

Education
Teeters earned his BS in political science from the University of Wyoming.

Elections
2012 Teeters was unopposed for both the August 21, 2012 Republican Primary, winning with 1,472 votes, and the November 6, 2012 General election, winning with 3,790 votes.
2006 Teeters won the three-way August 22, 2006 Republican Primary with 909 votes (52.9%), and was unopposed for the November 7, 2006 General election, winning with 2,774 votes.
2008 Teeters was unopposed for the August 19, 2008 Republican Primary, winning with 1,172 votes, and won the November 4, 2008 General election, winning with 2,690 votes (69.8%) against Democratic nominee Russell Johnson.
2010 Teeters was unopposed for both the August 17, 2010 Republican Primary, winning with 1,794 votes, and the November 2, 2010 General election, winning with 2,778 votes.

References

External links
Official page at the Wyoming Legislature
 

Place of birth missing (living people)
1983 births
Living people
Republican Party members of the Wyoming House of Representatives
People from Lingle, Wyoming
University of Wyoming alumni